Joseph Howard Ball (4 April 1931 – 4 December 1974) was a professional footballer who played as a winger. He was born in Walsall. In a short career, he played for three clubs. They were Banbury Spencer who he left in 1951 for Ipswich Town. He stayed with them until 1954, when he moved to his final club, Aldershot.

References

External links
 Joe Ball's profile on the Pride of Anglia Website

1931 births
1974 deaths
Sportspeople from Walsall
English footballers
Association football wingers
Banbury United F.C. players
Ipswich Town F.C. players
Aldershot F.C. players
English Football League players